In the history of optical storage media there have been and there are different optical disc formats with different data writing/reading speeds.

Original CD-ROM drives could read data at about 150 kB/s, 1× constant angular velocity (CAV), the same speed of compact disc players without buffering. As faster drives were released, the write speeds and read speeds for optical discs were multiplied by manufacturers, far exceeding the drive speeds originally released onto the market. In order to market increasing drive speeds, manufacturers used the symbol n×, whereby n is the multiple of the original speed. For example, writing to a CD at 8× will be twice as fast as writing onto a disc at 4×.

There are two main types of disc speed, which are the angular and linear velocities. If the disc spins at a constant angular velocity, the linear velocity is 2.4 times higher at the outer edge.

Various optical disc formats writing/reading speeds 

Modern compact discs support a writing speed of 52× and higher, with some modern DVDs supporting speeds of up to 24×. It is important to note that the speed of writing a DVD at 1× is approximately 9 times as fast as writing a CD at 1×. However, the actual speeds depend on the type of data being written to the disc.

For Blu-ray discs, 1× speed is defined as 36 megabits per second (Mbit/s), which is equal to 4.5 megabytes per second (MB/s). However, as the minimum required data transfer rate for Blu-ray movie discs is 54 Mbit/s, the minimum speed for a Blu-ray drive intended for commercial movie playback should be 2×. The fastest Blu-ray speed is 16×. For CDs, the 1× writing speed is equivalent to the 1× reading speed, which in turn represents the speed at which a piece of media can be read in its entirety, 74 minutes. Those 74 minutes come from the maximum playtime that the Red Book (audio CD standard) specifies for a digital audio CD (CD-DA); although now, most recordable CDs can hold 80 minutes worth of data. The DVD and Blu-ray discs hold a higher capacity of data, so reading or writing those discs in the same 74-minute time-frame requires a higher data transfer rate.

In video games
Since their debut on various optical storage media during the fifth up to before the seventh generation (1994–2005), the size of data in video games did not require an installation on a non-optical support and the reading speed of optical drives was enough so that data could be read directly from optical discs. As seventh generation video games caught on, the size of data, higher quality texture mapping etc., required in turn a higher stream of data coming out of optical storage media. A gap was becoming evident between design/graphics needs and technological limitations of reading speed/transfer rate.

Video games for PlayStation 3 were stored on single-layer Blu-ray which has a higher transfer rate by default but the console's optical drive speed multiplier was set at 2× (9 MB/s). On Xbox 360, video games were stored on common dual-layer 8.5 GB DVDs but with the console's 12× drive speed multiplier (16.5 MB/s), Xbox 360 could achieve up to 85% faster data transfer rate than PlayStation 3. Slower transfer rate on PlayStation 3 led many multi-platform developers for a mandatory installation of a portion of the disc's content on the console's hard disk drive (HDD) in order to offset problems such as longer loading times. Xbox 360 could install games entirely on HDD and potentially improve loading times but this was never mandatory. Optical discs were still required to boot games. Seventh generation video games rarely filled the space of an entire single-layer Blu-ray disc (25 GB) or required two or more DVDs on Xbox 360.

From the eighth generation onward, full 1080p high-definition graphics, higher quality textures, further required a higher stream of data and as such Blu-ray optical drives' reading speed at 6× (27 MB/s) soon proved to be insufficient. For this reason, consoles like PlayStation 4 force-install video games entirely on HDD, which allows a higher stream of data. Like it was for Xbox 360, optical discs are still required to boot games.

Theoretical versus practical writing speed 
Almost all modern CD/DVD-burning software supports a selection of speeds at which the writable disc can be written. However, the option a user chooses only defines the theoretical maximum of disc burning process. There are other factors that influence the time taken for a disc to be written to:
 Resources available to the program: Reading or writing data on a disc consumes moderate to high level of system resources (including memory and CPU resources), and running other programs at the same time may force the CD/DVD drive to choose a lower speed automatically, to accommodate the available resources.
 Disc quality: optical disc recorders detect the available speed options based on the data which is available on the disc itself. However, some low-quality discs make a high-speed option available to the software, while the burning process can never reach that speed in practice.
 The reading and writing process may not happen at a steady speed. CD drives and many early DVD drives stored data with constant linear velocity, so that the data rate remained the same regardless of the position of the optical head. Modern DVD drives use constant angular velocity to allow transferring data at the highest supported physical rotation speed and/or random access without needing to adjust the physical rotation speed on every jump, and Zoned Constant Linear Velocity for writing reliably with different data rates in different zones.

Optimal writing speed 
A higher writing speed results in a faster disc burn, but the optical quality may be lower (i.e. the disc is less reflective). If the reflectivity is too low for the disc to be read accurately, some parts may be skipped or it may result in unwanted audio artifacts such as squeaking and clicking sounds. For optimal results, it is suggested that a disc be burnt at its rated speed.

See also 
 Data-rate units
 List of optical disc authoring software
 Optical disc drive
 Optical disc authoring
 Reading (computer)

References 

Compact disc
Blu-ray Disc
DVD
Optical computer storage media
Optical disc authoring
Rotating disc computer storage media